Tímea Babos and Mandy Minella were the defending champions, but they decided not to participate. Garbiñe Muguruza and Romina Oprandi are the new champions, defeating in the final Katarzyna Piter and Maryna Zanevska with the score 4-6, 6-2, [11-9].

Seeds

Draw

Draw

References
 Main Draw

Grand Prix SAR La Princesse Lalla Meryem - Doubles
2014 Doubles
2014 in Moroccan tennis